Abdulrahman Al-Shoaibi (Arabic: عبدالرحمن الشعيبي) (b. December 10, 1980) is a Saudi Arabian former footballer who last played for Hajer Club (Arabic: نادي هجر) .

On October 20, 2005 in a match between Al-Raed and Hajer, Abdulrahman Al-Shoaibi collapsed after a kick to the neck and had a dramatic seizure on camera. This later became famous as an urban legend for a YouTube clip apparently showing Al-Shoaibi being taken by an "angel of death." Many sources claim that he died at the scene, but in reality Al-Shoaibi was fit to play in the next game and also scored 2 goals .

References

Living people
Year of birth missing (living people)
Saudi Arabian footballers
People from Al-Hasa
Hajer FC players
Al Jeel Club players
Association football forwards
Saudi First Division League players